Ten ships of the Royal Navy have borne the name HMS Contest:

  or Gunboat No. 16 was a 14-gun vessel launched in 1797 and broken up in 1799.
  was a 5-gun gun-brig, previously the Dutch Hell-hound. She was captured in 1799 and broken up in 1803.
  was a 14-gun schooner purchased in 1799 and broken up later that year.
  was a 12-gun gun-brig launched in 1804; she foundered in 1809.
  was a 12-gun gun-brig launched in 1812 and wrecked in 1828.
  was a 12-gun brig launched in 1846 and broken up in 1868.
  was a composite screw gunboat launched in 1874 and scrapped in 1889.
  was a  launched in 1894 and sold in 1911.
  was an  destroyer launched in 1913 and sunk by SM U-106 in 1917.
  was a  destroyer launched in 1944 and sold in 1960.

Royal Navy ship names